ŠK Blava Jaslovské Bohunice is a Slovak football team, based in the town of Jaslovské Bohunice. The club was founded in 1928.

Notable players
The following players had international caps for their respective countries. Players whose name is listed in bold represented their countries while playing for Blava.
Past (and present) players who are the subjects of Wikipedia articles can be found here.

 Siradji Sani

External links 
Official club website 

Football clubs in Slovakia
Association football clubs established in 1928
1928 establishments in Slovakia